Richard Smith (by 1453–1516) was an English politician and courtier.

Richard was a cloth merchant with premises in both the City of London and Reading in Berkshire. He obtained a number of minor royal appointments before becoming a Yeoman of the Robes to Queen Elizabeth of York in the late 1480s. He was also the Royal bailiff at Swallowfield Park and held the same position under Sir Francis Knollys at Caversham. He was elected a Member (MP) of the Parliament of England for Reading in 1497, 1504 and 1512.

References

15th-century births
1516 deaths
People from Reading, Berkshire
People from Caversham, Reading
People from Swallowfield
People from the City of London
15th-century English businesspeople
16th-century English businesspeople
English MPs 1497
English MPs 1504
English MPs 1512–1514
Members of the Parliament of England (pre-1707) for Reading